Solomon's Splendor is a 2000 album by Trace Bundy. It comprises original instrumental music on acoustic guitar. This album was re-released in February 2003.

Track listing

References

External links
Official Trace Bundy Web site
Official Myspace Profile

2004 albums
Trace Bundy albums